The women's bantamweight (−55 kilograms) event at the 2002 Asian Games took place on Saturday 12 October 2002 at Gudeok Gymnasium, Busan, South Korea.

Like all Asian Games taekwondo events, the competition was a straight single-elimination tournament. 

A total of ten competitors from ten different countries (NOCs) competed in this event, limited to fighters whose body weight was less than 55 kilograms.

Yun Kyung-rim of South Korea won the gold medal after beating Chonnapas Premwaew of Thailand in gold medal match 2–0.

Schedule
All times are Korea Standard Time (UTC+09:00)

Results 
Legend
R — Won by referee stop contest

References
2002 Asian Games Official Report, Page 728

External links
Official website

Taekwondo at the 2002 Asian Games